Taewon An clan was one of the Korean clans. Their Bon-gwan was in Shanxi, China. According to the research in 2000, the number of Taewon An clan was 1396. He was from Taiyuan and served as bureaucrat in Yuan dynasty. He entered Goryeo as a fatherly master of Queen Noguk, an Imperial princess who had a marriage to an ordinary person. He served as Minister of Rites and began Taewon An clan. Taiyuan was his hometown.

See also 
 Korean clan names of foreign origin

References

External links 
 

Korean clan names of Chinese origin